How the Stalos were Tricked is a Saami fairy tale collected by J. C. Poestion in Lapplandische Märchen. It was later adapted by Andrew Lang in his collection of folklore and fairy tales,The Orange Fairy Book.

Synopsis

A boy saw a giant man in the woods, and his mother identified it as a Stalo, a man-eater.

External links
How the Stalos were Tricked

Sámi fairy tales